Crataegus ucrainica is a putative species of hawthorn found in Ukraine. A 2014 molecular and morphological study reduced it to a synonym of Crataegus meyeri.

References

ucrainica
Plants described in 1939